Ann, Anne or Annie Clark may refer to:

Annie Clark (physician) (1844–1925), Scottish medical doctor
Ann Nolan Clark (1896–1995), American writer
Anne Clark (netball) (1903–1983), Australian sportswoman
Anne Clark Martindell (1914–2008,  Clark), American politician  
Anne Rogers Clark (1929–2006), American dog breeder and show judge
Anne Clark (poet) (born 1960), English poet, songwriter and electronic musician
 Anne Erin "Annie" Clark (born 1982), known as St. Vincent, American musician 
Annie E. Clark (born 1989), Women's rights campaigner
Annie Clark (actress) (born 1992), Canadian actress known for Degrassi: The Next Generation

See also
Anne Clarke (disambiguation)
Anna Clark (disambiguation)